Decies-without-Drum is a barony in County Waterford, Ireland.

Etymology

Decies (Déisi Muman) north of the Drum Hills (Drom Fhinín). "Without" is used with the meaning of "beyond" or "outside."

Geography
Decies-without-Drum is located in the centre of County Waterford, including the coast between Dungarvin and Dunbrattin Head. It is divided from Decies-within-Drum by the Drum Hills. It is mostly upland, and is bordered to the west by the Munster Blackwater, and contains most of the River Bricky and Colligan River.

History
Déisi Muman were an ancient Gaelic Irish tribe that occupied this territory; their name means "Vassals of Mumu." and they are believed by some historians to have Gaulish origin. Drumlohan Souterrain and Ogham Stones is an important historic site (AD 400–900).

The origin Decies barony was divided into two halves some time between 1654 and 1774.

Various branches of the Power / La Poer family owned land in the region before the Cromwellian settlement. Some of it also belonged to the Welsh/Walsh family.

List of settlements

Towns and villages in Decies-without-Drum barony include:

Abbeyside
Ballinamult
Bunmahon
Dungarvan
Kill
Kilmacthomas
Lemybrien

References

Baronies of County Waterford